7 mm may refer to:

Rail transport modelling

Firearms
 7 mm caliber, bullet cartridges used in guns